Tina Macpherson (born 20 August 1949) is an Australian former cricketer. Macpherson played one test and five one day internationals for the Australia national women's cricket team.

Records 
 She notably holds the record for becoming the first woman to grab a five-wicket haul on WODI debut.
 Macpherson also the first woman to take a five-for in a WODI 
 She is also the first bowler to grab a five wicket haul in Women's Cricket World Cup history
Macpherson also holds the title of being a local legend in the Bowral Community

References

External links
 Tina Macpherson at southernstars.org.au

Living people
1949 births
Australia women Test cricketers
Australia women One Day International cricketers
New South Wales Breakers cricketers